Aynak is a rural locality (a station) in Slavgorod, Altai Krai, Russia. The population was 10 as of 2013.

References 

Rural localities in Slavgorod urban okrug